The Burn, a house built in 1834, is the oldest documented Greek Revival residence in Natchez, Mississippi.  It was built on a knoll to the north of the old town area of Natchez.  It was listed on the National Register of Historic Places in 1979.

The house is a one-and-a-half-story Greek Revival double-pile central hall plan building built of frame construction upon a brick basement.  It has a five bay east-facing façade with a pedimented portico supported by four fluted Doric columns.

It was built to be the residence of John P. Walworth, a wealthy planter, merchant, banker, and politician.

Description of the Present and Original Physical Appearance 
The Greek Revival house is built on a brick basement half raised in the front and fully raised in the back. It is located on a high knoll rising from the western side of North Union Street in the northern outpost of the old town area of Natchez. Four inside end brick-chimneys and two gabled dormers on the front slope, and a large shed dormer on the rear slope pierced the gabled roof. The facade on the eastern side is a five-bay composition. The weather-boarded end bays are defined by pilasters with applied rectilinear bands of Grecian design resting upon a wide molded base and supporting an elaborately enriched full entablature of the Greek Doric order. The base and the entablature break forward before the 3 plastered central bays to define a pedimented portico which is supported by fluted Greek Doric columns. A railing of rectangular sectioned balusters with magnificently molded hand and base rails connects the columns. The portico is decorated with molded panels set into the soffit of the entablature. It is adorned by a thermal window set into the matched boards of the tympanum as well.

The plastered front section’s windows are placed above molded panels. The plastered wall is completed with a molded base with 2 fasciae that match the bases of the first-floor interior and the upstairs hall. Every window of the house has a six-over-six double-hung sash, the windows are closed by shutter blinds. The entrance has a full entablature which is supported by attached half-round fluted columns and pilasters. One transom and sidelights set over molded panels surround the single-leaf eight-panel molded door.

The Burn’s interior design consists of a double-pile central-hall plan. Door and window surrounds have 2 fasciae and molded architraves, and windows are placed above molded panels.  The northern side rooms of the house are separated by sliding doors carrying full entablatures which are supported by symmetrically molded pilasters that are extensions of the door and window architraves.  All rooms but the southern front room have original wooden mantels containing attached half-round Greek Doric columns supporting entablatures. The southern front room has a mantel (of the mid-19th century) with a cartouche. The four main rooms downstairs have original elaborate plaster ceiling pieces. The later additions include earlier-period-designed cornices, a chair railing in the dining room, and an upstairs ceiling piece.

The Burn’s magnificent architectural feature is the staircase, which rises in a short straight flight along the southern hall wall before making an elegant half-circular turn through space to end in the upstairs hall.  A series of turned balusters composed the newel, and the stair is furnished with ornamental brackets. The four bedrooms upstairs and the portico room have two-panel molded doors, architrave door and window surrounds, and simply beaded bases. The sizable rear bedrooms have excellent pilastered mantelpieces and a couple of bedrooms in the front have wooden architrave mantelpieces.

A partly enclosed primal service stair leads from the upstairs hall to the double-tiered back gallery, which is entered from the main floor by a frontispiece doorway identical to the front. The upper gallery has been enclosed and expanded on the end bays but is open across the central bays, where original round Doric columns support the gallery. A double flight of stairs which is not original leads to the ground-level gallery which is supported by brick piers. The raised basement is divided into four rooms, all of which are largely redecorated. There is one room that seems to have served primarily as a winter kitchen. A two-story hipped-roof brick outbuilding has been transformed into guest accommodations. A railed walk to the second-story back gallery of the latter connects the second-storey gallery of the four-room building to the main house.

Statement of Significance 
The Burn was erected in 1834 as the house of John P. Walworth who was a wealthy planter, merchant, banker, and politician. The builder of the establishment was the firm of Montgomery and Keys (spelled variously as Keyes), which, in an 1837 proposal to build the west wing and the west kitchen of the Historic Jefferson College indicated that the college board members take a ‘squint’ at the Walworth house in the northern part of the city for an example of the firm’s work.

John P. Walworth was born in 1798 in Aurora, New York. In 1819,  he came to Natchez by way of Cleveland, Ohio. Walworth started his working career as a clerk in the Natchez post office but by 1825 he and his brother Horace had started their own mercantile business in Natchez. Walworth married Woodsen Wren’s daughter Sarah Wren in 1827. Walworth’s father-in-law was an early Natchez postmaster and organizer of Masonic lodges in Mississippi. Walworth became the president of The Planters’ Bank in 1833. Afterward, he became the mayor and alderman of Natchez. Walworth gathered real estate worth $300,000 and personal property of $26,000 by 1860, and this wealth made him one of the wealthiest men in Adams County. He was enlisted in the 1860 census as a planter, his working plantations were situated across the Mississippi River in Louisiana and Arkansas.

The Burn got its historic name during its construction in accordance with family tradition. ‘Brook’, a Scottish word, was selected since a small brook originally flowed through the property.  A deed of 1881 remains the first legal reference to the house by its historic name. Conforming to the 1864 map of the defenses of Natchez, The Burn was situated inside Fort McPherson which was the Union fortification in Natchez, and family tradition maintains that the residence was utilized as a Union hospital at the time of the war. Photographs of the residence which were captured at the time of the Union occupation of Natchez exhibit Union soldiers on the porch.

Douglas Walworth became the owner of the house after the death of his parents. Douglas was adjutant general to William T. Martin who was a Confederate general from Natchez, with whom Douglas was also associated in a law practice. From 1859 to 1860, Douglas served as a state legislator. He also worked as the editor of The Daily Democrat in Natchez for many years. The Walworth family owned the Burn until 1935. Mr. and Mrs. Reuben L. Harper bought the residence in 1978, they extensively renovated the house and grounds. The Burn welcomes tourists every day and it has been on the Natchez Pilgrimage tour.

References

Official Link to book the Burn

Houses on the National Register of Historic Places in Mississippi
Houses completed in 1834
Houses in Natchez, Mississippi
Greek Revival houses in Mississippi
National Register of Historic Places in Natchez, Mississippi
1834 establishments in Mississippi